The 2018 Alabama Crimson Tide softball team is an American softball team, representing the University of Alabama for the 2018 NCAA softball season. The Crimson Tide play their home games at Rhoads Stadium. After losing in the 2017 NCAA Super Regionals, the 2018 team looks to make the postseason for the 20th straight year, and the Women's College World Series for twelfth time. This season represents the 22nd season of softball in the school's history.

Personnel

Roster

2018 Alabama Crimson Tide Softball Roster

Coaching staff

Schedule 

|-
!colspan=9| Sand Dollar Classic

|-
!colspan=9| Black and Gold Tournament

|-
!colspan=9| Easton Bama Bash

|-
!colspan=9| 

|-
!colspan=9| Husky Classic

|-
!colspan=9| Easton Crimson Classic

|-
!colspan=9|

Honors and awards
 None

Ranking movement

See also
 2018 Alabama Crimson Tide baseball team

References

Alabama
Alabama Crimson Tide softball seasons
Alabama Crimson Tide softball season
Alabama